The World Trade Center of San Marino is located in Dogana, Serravalle, only  from its border with Italy and the river Ausa. It was designed by British architecture firm Foster and Partners in collaboration with Studio Antao.

The cost of building was  €30 million.

References

External links 

Office buildings in San Marino
Foster and Partners buildings
World Trade Centers